David Kim is an American businessman and was CEO of Mexican fast food chain Baja Fresh.  He was also the CEO of other food brands including Sweet Factory and La Salsa.   Kim is no longer associated with any of those brands.

Career
He was appeared in an episode of the CBS series Undercover Boss.  On the show he offered a Baja Fresh franchise to an employee.

Kim is now the managing director of Ignite Enterprises whose primary business is consulting with companies and entrepreneurs aiming to help them establish and grow their brands in the US.

Books
 Kim, David, Ignite!: The 12 Values That Fuel Billionaire Success.

References

External links
Homepage

American people of Korean descent
American restaurateurs
Living people
American chief executives of food industry companies
Year of birth missing (living people)